Lebanese people in Kuwait have a population exceeding 41,775 and other estimates report a total of 106,000 Lebanese in Kuwait. Lebanese people form one of the largest community of non-citizen Arabs in Kuwait. In addition, an increasing number of Lebanese students seeking education and career opportunities opted for the country in light of its relatively reputable institutions across the Middle East. Most of the Lebanese people in Kuwait live mainly in the capital city of Kuwait City.

Lebanese people in Kuwait
Samir Atallah
Mouna Ayoub
Diana Haddad
Wadih el-Hage
Abdalla El-Masri
Rabih Haddad
Ahmed Al-Tarabulsi

See also
 Arab diaspora
 Lebanese diaspora
 Armenians in Kuwait

References

Arabs in Kuwait
 
 
Kuwait
Ethnic groups in Kuwait
Kuwait–Lebanon relations
Kuwait
Kuwait